Feather headdress may refer to:
War bonnet (Plains Indians)
Montezuma's headdress (Mexico)
Mahiole (Hawaii)
Toupha (Byzantium)

See also
 Featherwork

Headgear
Featherwork